Lennox Lewis vs. Shannon Briggs, billed as "March Badness", was a professional boxing match contested on March 28, 1998 for the WBC and Lineal Heavyweight Championships.

Background
After Lennox Lewis successfully defended his WBC title in a dominating first round knockout victory over Andrew Golota, the WBC organized an elimination match between Lineal champion George Foreman and Shannon Briggs to determine who would become Lewis' next opponent. The match was held on November 22, 1997 and went the full 12 rounds. Though many assumed that Foreman had won the match, (both Harold Lederman and the associated press had Foreman ahead by four points on their unofficial scorecards) the three judges saw differently. Two judges had Briggs the winner by scores of 117–113 and 116–112 while the third ruled the bout a draw with a score of 114–114, giving Briggs the victory by majority decision. Though Foreman's promoters protested the result and Lewis instead turned his attention to a potential unification match with Evander Holyfield, Lewis ultimately agreed to defend his WBC championship against Briggs.

The fight
Lewis was able to control most of the first round by effectively using his strong left jab to keep Briggs off balance while occasionally landing some power punches as well. However, with only 30 seconds left in the round, Briggs was able to land a short left hand that staggered Lewis. Briggs then began a furious 20-second rally that saw him land several power punches in an attempt to gain the knockout victory. Briggs concluded his assault with a right hook that sent Lewis stumbling into the corner with 15 seconds left, Briggs quickly attempted to continue his attack with Lewis in the corner, but Lewis was able to get a hold of Briggs and clinched him until the round ended. Lewis rebounded in round two and much like in the previous round, used his left jab to keep Briggs at bay. However, as the second minute of the round came to a close, Briggs landed a powerful left hook that staggered Lewis, but Lewis was able to withstand Briggs' follow-up combination and ended the round strongly by landing two combinations within the round's last 10 seconds. 

Lewis began the fourth round aggressively and landed a combination that sent Briggs into the ropes. Briggs attempted to backpedal away, but Lewis landed a right hand that stunned Briggs. After continuing his assault on Briggs, Lewis was finally to gain a knockdown after a right hook dropped Briggs to the canvas 43 seconds into the round. Briggs was able to answer the referee's count, but Lewis was able to quickly get Briggs up against the ropes and proceeded to land several more punches before Briggs was finally able to punch his way out. After being dominated by Lewis for the entire round, Briggs was able to land some offense and hit Lewis with a strong left hand with 42 seconds left in the round. Lewis avoided Briggs' follow-up punches and countered with a left hook and a three-punch combination that again sent Briggs down to mat. Briggs was able to answer the referee's count at eight and survived the remainder of the round. 

Lewis continued to punish Briggs with power punches in the fifth round and knocked Briggs down for the third time with a powerful right hook at 1:09 into the round. Briggs laid flat on his back for five second but got back up at the count of eight and continued with the fight. Lewis continued to pummel Briggs and after Briggs collapsed to the mat following a missed left hook, referee Frank Cappuccino stopped the fight and awarded Lewis the victory by technical knockout.

Undercard
Confirmed bouts:

Broadcasting

References

Briggs
World Boxing Council heavyweight championship matches
1998 in boxing
1998 in New Jersey
March 1998 sports events in the United States
Boxing on HBO
Boxing matches at Boardwalk Hall